388 Bridge Street is a 590-foot residential high-rise skyscraper in Downtown Brooklyn, within New York City. It contains 378 market rate units, mixed between 234 rentals and 144 condominiums. The building was originally under construction as an all condominium tower before the 2000s real estate crash and subsequent Great Recession. Construction halted from 2008 to 2012 due to the recession, but resumed in 2013.

When topped out in 2013, it was the tallest building in Brooklyn, passing the four-year-old Brooklyner, until it, too, was passed by AVA DoBro. 388 Bridge Street is now the fourth-tallest in Brooklyn.

Gallery

See also
List of tallest buildings in Brooklyn
List of tallest buildings in New York City

References

External links

Official website
388 Bridge Street on CTBUH
388 Bridge Street on Emporis
388 Bridge Street on Skyscraperpage.com

Residential buildings in Brooklyn
Downtown Brooklyn
2010s architecture in the United States
2014 establishments in New York City
Condominiums and housing cooperatives in Brooklyn
Residential condominiums in New York City
Residential buildings completed in 2014
Postmodern architecture
Residential skyscrapers in New York City
Skyscrapers in Brooklyn